Patrick Tringler (born 29 September 1995) is an Austrian darts player who plays in Professional Darts Corporation events.

In 2019, he made his PDC European Tour debut in the 2019 Austrian Darts Open, where he was defeated in the first round by Jamie Hughes.

References

External links

1995 births
Living people
Austrian darts players
Professional Darts Corporation associate players
Game players from Vienna
21st-century Austrian people